Phyllium ericoriai is a species of leaf insect in the family Phylliidae.

References 

Phylliidae
Insects described in 2009